The 1926 Washington Huskies football team was an American football team that represented the University of Washington during the 1926 college football season. In its sixth season under head coach Enoch Bagshaw, the team compiled an 8–2 record, finished in fifth place in the Pacific Coast Conference, and outscored all opponents by a combined total of 213 to 60. George Guttormsen was the team captain.

Schedule

References

Washington
Washington Huskies football seasons
Washington Huskies football